Dolna Bela Crkva (meaning Lower White Church) is a village in the Resen Municipality of North Macedonia, north of Lake Prespa.

Demographics
Dolna Bela Crkva has an Orthodox ethnic Macedonian majority, with a significant Muslim Albanian Sunni and Bektashi minority, of whom the latter are known locally as Kolonjarë. Sunni Albanians in Dolna Bela Crkva traditionally highlighted their religious identity over a linguistic one having closer economic and social relations with Turks and Macedonian Muslims in the region and being distant from Orthodox Macedonians. Over time these differences have disappeared through intermarriage, closer communal and cultural relations with Bektashi and other Sunni Prespa Albanian communities in the region.

Gallery

References

Villages in Resen Municipality